Želivka Water Tunnel is the sixth longest water tunnel in the world. It is 51.97 kilometres long. It was finished in 1972.

History 
In 1965, the first phase of construction of a water supply line from Želivka (Czech Republic) began far away from Prague. Soon, a 51 kilometres long tunnel was being cut to bring clean water from the treatment plant in Nesměřice to Jesenice. Meanwhile, there already were two lines leading from the water tank in Jesenice, one going north-west to Libuš, Novodvorská, and further, the second one going to Chodov, to Kozinec by Hostivař and further. On 2 April 1967, dredgers and bulldozers started digging trenches for three parallel lines in the Chodov cadastre. The water was supposed to be moving via gravity feed, which is why everything that was in the way of the best route had to go.

References 

Tunnels in the Czech Republic
Water tunnels